Araguari River may refer to:

 Araguari River (Amapá), Brazil
 Araguari River (Minas Gerais), also called Rio das Velhas, Brazil